The Azores Ladies Open was a women's professional golf tournament on the LET Access Series, held between 2011 and 2017 in the Azores, an Autonomous Region of Portugal.

The tournament was the first LET Access Series event to be staged in Portugal. Sponsored by the Azores Tourist Board, it was held three times at Campo de Golf de Batalha in Ponta Delgada on São Miguel Island, home to the Azores Senior Open, and three times on Terceira Island.

Winners

References

External links

LET Access Series events
Golf tournaments in Portugal